Blasphemers' Maledictions is the fifth studio album by Polish death metal band Azarath. It was released on 29 June 2011  by Witching Hour Productions. The album was recorded between January, February and April 2011 at Hertz Studio in Białystok, Poland, and was produced by Zbigniew "Inferno" Promiński, Sławomir Wiesławski and Wojciech Wiesławski.

The album was preceded by the 7-inch EP Holy Possession, which was released on 10 April 2011.

Track listing
All music composed by Bart and Inferno. All lyrics written by Necrosodom.

Credits
Azarath 
Marek "Necrosodom" Lechowski – vocals, lead guitar 
Bartłomiej "Bart" Szudek – rhythm guitar, lead guitar
Piotr "P." Ostrowski – bass guitar
Zbigniew "Inferno" Promiński – drums, additional guitars, producing
Production 
Wojciech and Sławomir Wiesławscy – sound engineering, producing, mixing 
Zbigniew Bielak – cover art and layout
Agnieszka Krysiuk, Konrad Adam Mickiewicz – photography

References

2011 albums
Azarath (band) albums